Sue is the debut album by English pop group Frazier Chorus, released in 1989 by Virgin Records.

The CD version of the album included an extra track, "Little Chef". In 2008, the album was reissued with bonus tracks by Cherry Red Records.

Track listing

2008 Cherry Red CD bonus tracks

Personnel 

Frazier Chorus
Tim Freeman – lead vocals, keyboards
Chris Taplin – clarinet, programming 
Kate Holmes – flute
Michéle Allardyce – percussion

Additional musicians
Tim Sanders – tenor saxophone (track 3, 7)
Roddy Lorimer – trumpet (track 3), flugelhorn (track 3, 7), trumpet solo (7)
Simon Clarke – alto saxophone (track 3), baritone saxophone (track 3, 7), piccolo saxophone (track 7)
Kate St John – oboe (track 5)
"Huge" Jones – "additional oohs and aahs" (track 5)
Paul Sirett – guitar (tracks 7, 9)
David Olney – double bass (track 11)
The Kick Horns – brass
Martyn Phillips – programming

Technical
Hugh Jones – producer, engineer (tracks 1–3, 5–10)
Cenzo Townsend – assistant engineer 
Jerry Kitchingham – engineer
Mark Freegard – engineer
The Douglas Brothers – photography
Bill Smith Studio – design
David Bedford – string arrangements, conductor (tracks 3, 5–7)
The Kick Horns – brass arrangements
Bob Kraushaar – co-producer, engineer (tracks 4, 11)
Frazier Chorus – co-producer (tracks 4, 11)

Chart performance

References

External links

Music videos from Sue
 1. "Dream Kitchen"
 5. "Sloppy Heart"
 9. "Typical!"

1989 debut albums
Frazier Chorus albums